The Sons of Jacob Synagogue is a historic synagogue at 24 Douglas Avenue in Providence, Rhode Island.  It is a two-story brick structure, set on a raised basement.  The main facade is three bays wide, with a pair of entry doors sheltered by a simple gable-roof portico.  The building was constructed in two stages, 1906 and 1926, and is the major surviving remnant of what was once a large Jewish community in the Smith Hill neighborhood of Providence.  The congregation which built it was formed in 1896 by Orthodox Jews who immigrated from Russia.  The first stage of the building, its lower level, housed the congregation until it could raise funds to build the upper level, and was then used as a shul.  The upper level was designed by Harry Marshak, a self-taught architect and builder born to immigrant Russian Jews, who was likely the first Jewish architect to work in the Providence area.

The building was listed on the National Register of Historic Places in 1989.

See also
National Register of Historic Places listings in Providence, Rhode Island

References

External links
Sons of Jacob Synagogue Official Site

European American culture in Rhode Island
National Register of Historic Places in Providence, Rhode Island
Synagogues completed in 1906
Russian-Jewish culture in the United States
Synagogues in Rhode Island
Synagogues on the National Register of Historic Places in Rhode Island
Synagogues completed in 1926
1906 establishments in Rhode Island